This is not officially a real solo album from Thåström but more of a soundtrack to a novel with the same name by Victor Rydberg, written in 1857. The album was only released in 1000 copies during its first release in 1998, but it was re-released in 2002 with a new cover. It is mostly instrumental.

Track listing
"Det sjunde inseglet" (Thåström, Hell) (The Seventh Seal)
"Requiem" (Thåström, Hell) 
"Erland" (Thåström, Hell)
"Transdans" (Thåström, Hell) (Trance dance)
"Polsk dimma" (Thåström, Hell) (Polish Mist)
"Demoner i 3D" (Thåström, Hell) (Demons In 3D)
"Piano, cello, stön" (Thåström, Hell) (Piano, Cello, Moans)
"Folklåten" (Thåström, Hell) (The People's Song)
"Bröllop" (Thåström, Hell) (Wedding)
"Sorgebarn" (Thåström, Hell) (Child of sadness)
"Psalm 70" (Thåström, Hell)

Personnel
Joakim Thåström and Niklas Hellberg - Writers and concept

Samples from Darling Desperados production of Victor Rydberg's Singoalla
Mari Lindbäck - Vocals
Erland Josephson - Dialogue
Oliver Loftéen - Vocals
Samuel Fröler - Dialogue

1998 soundtrack albums
Music based on novels